Bikaner Lok Sabha constituency  is one of the 25 Lok Sabha (parliamentary) constituencies in Rajasthan state in India.

Assembly segments
Presently, Bikaner Lok Sabha constituency comprises eight Vidhan Sabha (legislative assembly) segments. These are:

Members of Parliament

Election results

2019

2014

See also
 Bikaner district
 List of Constituencies of the Lok Sabha

Notes

External links
Bikaner lok sabha  constituency election 2019 result details

Bikaner
Lok Sabha constituencies in Rajasthan